The 2004 Ottawa Renegades season was the third season for the team in the Canadian Football League and 3rd overall. The Renegades finished the season with a 5–13 record and failed to make the playoffs.

Offseason

CFL Draft

Preseason

Regular season

Season Standings

Season schedule

References

Ottawa Renegades
2004
Ottawa Renegades